Wesleys Creek is a stream in Central Frontenac, Frontenac County, and Tay Valley, Lanark County in Eastern Ontario, Canada. It flows to Silver Lake and is in the Ottawa River drainage basin.

Course
It flows southwest, and enters Central Frontenac. Silver Lake flows via Silver Lake Creek, the Fall River and the Mississippi River to Lac des Chats on the Ottawa River.

The creek has numerous unnamed but no named inflows.

References

Rivers of Frontenac County
Rivers of Lanark County